George Chakravarthi is a multi-disciplinary artist working with photography, video, painting and performance. His work addresses the politics of identity including race, sexuality and gender, and also religious iconography among other subjects. He was born in India and moved to London, England in 1980.

He has exhibited and performed all over the UK and internationally at venues including Site Gallery, Sheffield, England; Tate Modern, London, England; Victoria and Albert Museum, London, England; Künstlerhaus Mousonturm, Frankfurt, Germany; Dance Academy (Tilburg), Tilburg, Netherlands; Queens Gallery, British Council, New Delhi, India; La Casa Encendida, Madrid, Spain; Brut Künstlerhaus, Vienna, Austria; Abrons Arts Center, New York City, USA; and City Art Gallery, Ljubljana, Slovenia.

Chakravarthi has been commissioned by the BBC, Artangel, Duckie, InIVA, the Arts Council of England, the British Council, the SPILL Festival of Performance, the Live Art Development Agency, the Shakespeare Birthplace Trust and the Royal Shakespeare Company.

Chakravarthi studied at the University of Brighton, the Royal Academy of Arts and the Royal College of Art.

Early life 

Chakravarthi was born in New Delhi, India on 26 November 1969 to parents with origins in Tamil Nadu, India and British Burma. His parents considered the education of their children a priority, so the family lived very modestly in order for him and his siblings to be privately educated while in India. Chakravarthi attended St. Columba's School, Delhi, an English-medium school run by a Roman Catholic brotherhood (Congregation of Christian Brothers). Although nominally brought up as a Catholic, Chakravarthi's family encouraged him to absorb and be influenced by Hinduism and Buddhism.

In 1980, Chakravarthi moved with his family to the UK. This was around the time of the Brixton and other riots, and the peaks for organised racism and electoral success of the far-right (National Front General election results in May 1979). Mary Brennan, reviewing the National Review of Live Art in 2001, described the effect on Chakravarthi of his move to the UK as follows:
 
He continued his education at St. Patrick's Primary School and St. Paul's Secondary School in south London, both Roman Catholic, multi-cultural schools. He began documenting his reactions to his new environment and his changing identity through writing and drawing, and then making photographic self-portraits (initially using photo booths until he was given a camera by the sculptor and photographer Hamish Horsley).

Chakravarthi left home at the age of 16 and eventually settled in a modest flat in Greenwich, London. He had a variety of jobs including stacking shelves in supermarkets, as a go-go dancer in various nightclubs and as a photographic and artist's model. He attended a short course in photography at the Thames Independent Photography Project (TIPP) where his interest in photography and particularly making self-portraits was encouraged.

Formal training 

Chakravarthi was an undergraduate at the University of Brighton. He obtained a first-class Bachelor of Arts in Visual and Performance Art. For the degree show he submitted ′Resurrection′ (a photograph 12 feet by 5 feet) and a live performance, the subject of both was The Last Supper, with Chakravarthi in the place of Jesus and women dressed in saris in the positions of the disciples, as depicted by Leonardo da Vinci. He received an award from Nagoya University for outstanding artistic achievement.

He started his postgraduate studies at the Royal Academy of Arts and, after taking a year out, he completed his Master of Arts at the Royal College of Art in 2003. For the final show at the Royal College of Art, he submitted ′Olympia′, a video installation based on the painting by Édouard Manet, with Chakravarthi in the position of the nude woman and a white man in the place of the black servant woman; it won him the Chris Garnham Award for 'Best Use of Photography'.

Career 

In 2003 Chakravarthi was involved in the Live Art Development Agency's "Live Culture" event at Tate Modern, contributing to Guillermo Gómez-Peña's collaboration

Publications
A survey of Chakravarthi's work can be found in "Sexuality (Whitechapel: Documents of Contemporary Art)" Edited by Amelia Jones, 2014.
"What do relationships mean to you? - Emotional Learning Cards" - image of Barflies used to represent gender identity.
"Performance Research - On Trans/Performance" - image of UNTITLED05, The Ambidextrous Universe used for cover.
"Agency - a partial history of live art" - conversation between Chakravarthi and Manuel Vason, and image of Negrophilia.
A still image from Chakravarthi's Olympia appears in "Rebels, radicals and revolutionaries: art and social change" by Marie-Anne Leonard

Themes 
A number of common themes are apparent in Chakravarthi’s work including:
 Self-portraiture: Many of Chakravarthi's works are various forms of self-portrait.
 Identity: Chakravarthi adopts numerous alter egos with different identities in his work; for example, he is male in some of the pieces within ‘Thirteen’, female for one of the characters in ‘Memorabilia/Aradhana’, transgender in ‘Barflies’, gay in ‘I Feel Love!’ and Indian in ‘Andhaka’.
 Race/multi-culturalism/racism: Jesus in ‘Resurrection’ is Indian and his hair, scattered over the table, is black in contrast to the (apparently) red hair of the white Jesus in Da Vinci's The Last Supper, and the female disciples are all dressed in traditional Indian saris reflecting Chakravarthi's cultural heritage (see the image of this work above). In ‘Olympia’ the servant is white and the “mistress” is Indian (see the image of this work above). ‘Negrophilia’  takes on the dichotomy between the fascination of some white audiences with black performers, e.g. Josephine Baker in Paris, and racist imagery in Hollywood cinema of the same era, e.g. the number ′Hot Voodoo′ in Blonde Venus, 1932  (Chakravarthi appears on stage in a gorilla costume), and subtly refers to evolution (ape to homo sapiens, and the origin of homo sapiens in the African continent).
 Gender/sexism/feminism: The female character in ‘Memorabilia/Aradhana’ is cast as a person to be married off and produce children for her husband. The twelve apostles in ‘Resurrection’ are all female, possibly alluding to the women apostles referred to in non-canonical Christian texts and in the Bible in Romans 16:7 (female disciples of Jesus). ‘Miss UK’, ‘Masking’ and ‘Barflies’ in particular address feminist politics.
 Sexuality/transvestitism: Chakravarthi dresses as female characters in many of his pieces of work, these include; ‘Memorabilia/Aradhana’, ‘Shakti’, ‘Barflies’, ‘Negrophilia’, some of the pieces within ‘Thirteen’, ‘Miss UK’ and ‘Andhaka’. In others (‘Remotecontrol’ and ‘Olympia’) the characters are androgynous. ‘To the Man in my Dreams’ can be interpreted as a son coming out to his father, or the correspondence between a gay man in a role-play relationship with an older man, among other possibilities. Chakravarthi’s character in ‘I Feel Love!’ (in terms of dress, the music used and his placement on a plinth) is probably based on a go-go dancer in a gay club.
 Self image/idealisation of image: ‘Remotecontrol’, ‘I Feel Love!’, ‘Barflies’ and ‘Miss UK’ all concern themselves with striving to have the ‘right’ image whether in terms of body, dress or age.
 Religion: ‘Shakti’ and ‘Andhaka’ explicitly refer to the Indian goddess Kali, and the Last Supper from the Bible is the subject of ‘Resurrection’. The layering of the components within the images of ‘Thirteen’ gives them an appearance of stained glass, particularly when displayed backlit in light boxes (see the photograph above of some of these images backlit in an exhibition), this may be a more subtle religious reference.
 Iconic paintings: A number of iconic paintings are specifically and unmistakably referenced by some of Chakravarthi's pieces, with details of the sets as well as the main subjects; Da Vinci's Mona Lisa in ‘Shakti’ and also his The Last Supper in ‘Resurrection’, and Manet's Olympia in ‘Olympia’. The use of gold and jewels in Cleopatra (within ‘Thirteen’) is reminiscent of works by Klimt (e.g. Adele Bloch-Bauer, 1907). Numerous paintings by Titian (e.g. Equestrian Portrait of Charles V, 1548) make dramatic use of clouds as does Chakravarthi's Lady Macbeth (also within ‘Thirteen’) – see the third image from the right in the photograph above of some of the images from ‘Thirteen’.

Personal life 
Chakravarthi is married and lives in London and Leicestershire. He and his husband have been together since January 1994, they were legally married at Chelsea Old Town Hall, King's Road, London in May 2006 (their civil partnership having later been converted into marriage).

See also
 Chakraborty - meaning of the name Chakravarthi.

References

External links 
 
 Show-reel of selected works of Chakravarthi 1997 - 2015 on YouTube
 Chakravarthi videos on YouTube
 Chakravarthi interview at Impressions Gallery, Bradford 12 April 2014 (audio)
 Chakravarthi interview by Adelaida Afilipoaie April 2014 (audio) for Ramair, Bradford University Student Radio
 Making the Cut – George Chakravarthi and Campbell, in conversation with InIVA curator Grant Watson (with links to audio recording and photographs), 2010

Living people
1969 births
Artists from London
British video artists
British installation artists
Political artists
British performance artists
British LGBT artists
Conceptual photographers
British LGBT photographers
Alumni of the University of Brighton
Alumni of the Royal Academy Schools
Alumni of the Royal College of Art
People from New Delhi
Indian emigrants to England
Naturalised citizens of the United Kingdom